Darjeeling Jela Dokan Sramik Union (translation: Darjeeling District Shop Workers Union), a trade union of shop workers in Darjeeling District, West Bengal, India. DJDSU is affiliated to the All India Federation of Trade Unions.

Trade unions in India
Indian Federation of Trade Unions
Retail trade unions
Trade unions in West Bengal
Organizations with year of establishment missing